L. C. Schnürlein (fl. nineteenth century) was a German mathematician and educator.

Having studied under Carl Friedrich Gauss, he became a teacher at the gymnasium in Hof, tutoring, among others, Carl Culmann and Philipp Ludwig von Seidel.

Bibliography
Hartenberg, R. S. (1981) "Cullman, Karl" in 

German schoolteachers
Year of birth missing
19th-century German people